Simon "Ossie" Stewart  (born 31 January 1954) is a British sailor. He won a bronze medal in the Soling class at the 1992 Summer Olympics with Lawrie Smith and Robert Cruickshank.

References
 Profile at sports-reference.com

1954 births
Living people
People from Surbiton
British male sailors (sport)
Olympic sailors of Great Britain
Sailors at the 1992 Summer Olympics – Soling
Olympic bronze medallists for Great Britain
Olympic medalists in sailing
Medalists at the 1992 Summer Olympics